The Dampier Peninsula is a peninsula located north of Broome and Roebuck Bay in Western Australia. It is surrounded by the Indian Ocean to the west and north, and King Sound to the east. It is named after the mariner and explorer William Dampier who visited it. The northernmost part of the peninsula is Cape Leveque. It is sparsely inhabited, mostly by Indigenous Australian peoples, some of whom have been granted native title rights to some of their traditional lands. There are many coastal inlets, bays and other features, including Beagle Bay on its western side.

Aboriginal heritage
The peninsula is home to a rich heritage of Aboriginal culture, with the communities of Beagle Bay, Bobieding, Djarindjin, Ardyaloon (One Arm Point) and Ngardalargin, along with numerous other smaller communities, pearling camps, tourist resorts and Aboriginal outstations.

The traditional owners of the areas around the peninsula are the Bardi, Nyunyul and Jabirr Jabirr (Djaberadjabera) peoples.

Ecology 
Many small trees, shrubs and animals live on and in the sea surrounding the peninsula, the most characteristic vegetation being pindan woodland.

Transport
The peninsula is traversed from south to north by Cape Leveque Road. Between Broome and Beagle Bay this road is generally of poor condition and often closed during the wet season. Four-wheel drive is recommended. Between Beagle Bay and the northern towns the road is bitumened. 

Numerous tour operators run bus services on the peninsula.

Air strips are situated at Cape Leveque, Bardi, Djarindjin (Lombadina), Beagle Bay and some of the smaller communities and pearl farms.

Tourism
There are several tourist accommodation facilities such as Kooljamon (Cape Leveque) and Middle Lagoon (Middle Lagoon).

References

External links
 Shire of Broome
 Broome Visitor Centre

Kimberley (Western Australia)
Coastline of Western Australia
Peninsulas of Western Australia
Kimberley tropical savanna